Disappearance is a 2017 Iranian drama film directed by Ali Asgari. The film had its world premiere at the 74th Venice International Film Festival in the Orizzonti section and later it was screened in the Discovery section at the 2017 Toronto International Film Festival.

Cast
 Sadaf Asgari
 Amir Reza Ranjbaran
 Nazanin Ahmadi
 Pedram Ansari
 Mohammad Heidari

References

External links
 

2017 films
2017 drama films
Iranian drama films
2010s Persian-language films